Edwards English School, Jamtara (informally EES) is an English medium high school affiliated to the Indian Certificate of Secondary Education (ICSE), New Delhi. It is situated in Budhudih village of Jamtara District, Jharkhand, and is one of the two ICSE school in Jamtara. It was established in 1995 by A. D. Shenoy and George Kurien. Anthony Reis is its principal.

The school educates up to class 10.

Houses

There are four houses in EES.

Edward House (red), named in honour of Edward Cornelies, a pioneer missionary who came to Jamtara about a century and half ago. He dedicated his life for the service of the children and needy. He was a captain in the Merchant Navy. He died in Jamtara in 1916
Kurien House (yellow), named after a preacher and teacher who died in 1992.
Shenoy House (green), named after A. D. Shenoy, the school founder who also worked to help the community in Jamtara more generally. He died in 2004.
Grace House (blue), is named after Grace E. George, a nurse who gave free medicines to the poor. The 'Grace Health Care Centre' was opened in her name. She died in 2013.

School magazine
The Edwardian is an annual collection of school happenings. It has English and Hindi sections and contains reports, speeches, photographs, poems, articles, and case studies of the school.

Sports
The sports curriculum was designed and implemented by Rishikesh Singh and Alfred Francis, who were sports teachers at the school. There are facilities for students and staff consisting of playing fields for football, basketball and a cricket ground.

References

1995 establishments in Bihar
Educational institutions established in 1995
Education in Jharkhand